The men's luge at the 2002 Winter Olympics began on 10 February,  and was completed on 11 February at Utah Olympic Park.

Results
The men's singles luge event was run over two days, with the first two runs on 10 February, and the second two runs on 11 February.  The total time was the combined time of all four runs. Hackl's fifth medal in a row, but not fourth gold in a row. He becomes the first person to win 5 medals in one event in either the summer or winter games. Zöggeler's gold gave him a complete set of medals at the Winter Olympics.

References

External links
2002 luge men's singles results

Luge at the 2002 Winter Olympics
Men's events at the 2002 Winter Olympics